Siyama or Siyama: Village of Warriors is a 2008 Thai action-fantasy film directed by Preecha Songsakul.

Plot
Siyama is the story of three Thai youths who are transported back in time to an ancient village in the last period of Ayutthaya kingdom. They find themselves in the midst of a vicious war with Burma before Ayutthaya is burned down (in April 1767).

Cast
Than Thanakorn as Prai
Thitima Maliwan as Ana
  as Gib
Bawriboon Chanreuang as Boat
Sompob Benjathikul as Khruu Jom
Viriya Juramakorn as Lung-Tup
Montri Ketkaew as Luang Putone
Hassapon Kongsib as Yuntra

External links
 

2008 films
Thai action films
Thai-language films
Fantasy adventure films
Films about time travel
Thai fantasy films